Ali B op volle toeren (literally "Ali B at full speed"), abbreviated as ABOVT, is a Dutch television programme hosted by Moroccan-Dutch rapper Ali B for broadcaster AVROTROS (previously TROS).The name refers to Op volle toeren, an earlier very popular Dutch music program broadcast on TROS in the 1970s and 1980s.
The programme initially aired between January 2011 and December 2016. In October 2020 ABOVT announced its return after a four-year-absence

Format

In each broadcast, Ali B couples with a fellow singer artist that changes in each episode. Usually each season is made up of 8 episodes. The guest artist chooses from his or her repertoire one of his own earlier hits, for the purpose of making a contemporary hip hop / urban "remake" / or cover version of the song by another invitee artist, usually a rapper / hip hop artist and vice versa.

Partaking artists are encouraged to use their own style giving the hit a real new twist. At the end of each episode, the artists would get together with Ali B to perform the new interpretations. Ali B often ends up participating in parts of the renditions, and so does falsetto-voiced producer Brownie Dutch. The artists would exchange opinions about the new revived versions of each other. The format has proved to be able to create crossover hits between traditional Dutch songs and urban hip hop music.
Some of the interpretations have appeared on the Dutch Single Top 100 and Dutch Top 40 as hits in their own right.

Franchise
The format of ABOVT has been sold to eight countries, including Belgium, Germany, Portugal, Ukraine and Switzerland. Cover My Song, was the series broadcast on German VOX channel hosted by German hip hop artist Dennis Lisk also known by his stage name Denyo. In addition, a Tuvalu producer launched a truly international variant called Cover Me in which artists from different countries came together to cover each other's hits. In the autumn of 2012, the a Flemish version, named In De Mix (literally In the mix) was launched with Brahim Attaeb (or simply Brahim) as host.

The various series titles include:

Seasons

Season 1

Season 2 
Due to huge popularity, the program returned for a second season. Also to create further interest, in season 2, and after the broadcast of each episode of the season, the website Sterren.nl would post a video of the hip hop song from the show. The clips were prepared by Teemong.

Season 3

Awards
In March 2011, Ali B op volle toeren won the Positive Young Media Award, specifically given to ventures that create positive role models for young people through the media. The jury mentioned the show's ability to bring together old and new Dutch cultures in a perfect match, in their citations for awarding the prize.

In May 2011, the Dutch show also received an honorable mention during presentation of the Zilveren Nipkowschijf awards event. In 2012, the Dutch show was nominated for the "Gouden Televizier-Ring", but the award eventually went to The Voice of Holland

Other versions have also won awards. Very notably the German version of the show Cover My Song was awarded the 2012 Deutscher Fernsehpreis, the main German Television Awards in the category "docutainment".

CDs / DVDs 
The interpretations from the first season of the program (except those of Anneke Gröhnloh and Stef Bos) were released in CD form in 2011. On iTunes, a further track "Meisje luister" by Willeke Alberti featuring Ali B was also made available. Ali B can be downloaded

All episodes were also released on a double DVD containing all eight episodes, with the CD provided as additional bonus for the DVD buyers.

Track list
 "De troubadour 2011" – Keizer & Ali B
 "De clown 2011" – Fresku & Ali B
 "Telkens weer 2011" – Kleine Viezerik & Ali B''
 "Vaders" – Negativ & Ali B
 "Bonnie" – Darryl & Ali B feat. Brownie Dutch
 "Rosamunde 2011" – Yes-R & Ali B feat. Brownie Dutch
 "Brandend hart" – Gio & Ali B
 "'t Is voorbij" – Winne & Ali B feat. Brownie Dutch
 "Spijt" – Lenny Kuhr
 "Hé man" – Ben Cramer
 "Luister meisje" – Willeke Alberti
 "Eeyeeyoo 2011" – Bonnie St. Claire (live)
 "Ik ben niet meer van jou" – Dennie Christian
 "32 jaar later" – Henny Vrienten
 "Meisje luister" – Willeke Alberti feat. Ali B (bonus exclusively on iTunes)

See also
In de mix
Cover My Song

References

2011 Dutch television series debuts
2010s Dutch television series